Colchester Corporation Tramways served the town of Colchester in Essex from 28 July 1904 until 8 December 1929.

History

A special depot was built at Magdalen Street, just south of the Town Centre, for the 16 brand-new, open-top, double-decker trams, numbered 1 to 16. The trams were manufactured by the Electric Railway and Tramway Carriage Works of Preston on Brill 21E trucks. On 28 July 1904, the trams commenced operation.

The brand new tram system consisted of three routes, all beginning at the North Station, at that time called the North Street Station. The first was to Lexden, a suburb to the west of the Town Centre via North Station Road, North Hill, Head Street then Lexden Road and Lexden Street. Up to Lexden Road, not inclusive, the route was double-tracked, from Lexden Road onwards it was single-track. The second route led to the River Colne on East Street via the double-tracked section up to the High Street, then via a double-tracked section through the High Street and onto a single-tracked section through East Hill to East Street. The third route was to Hythe, to the east of the Town Centre, via the double-tracked sections up to East Hill, where it turned onto another double-tracked section through Queen Street and St. Botolph's Street, where it became a single-track all the way to Hythe.

On 28 June 1906 another extension opened from St. Botolph's Station to the Recreation Ground via Military Road, completing the Colchester tram system.

Infrastructure

Routes were:
(Recreation Ground)
(Hythe)
(East Gates)
 North Hill, North Station Road to a terminus just through the railway bridge at  adjacent to Colchester railway station. (North Station)
(Lexden)

Tramcars
The fleet, in a livery of maroon/dark brown and cream, consisted of:
 18 open top double deck tramcars (manufactured by the Electric Railway and Tramway Carriage Works, later renamed the United Electric Car Company)

Closure

By 1927 there was not enough funding for the refurbishment and replacement of trams. The Colchester Corporation Act of 1927 allowed for the replacement of trams with motorbuses.

The first motorbus commenced operation on 21 May 1928, to replace the trams between North Station and East Street. On 9 December 1929, the final tram service between North Station and Recreational Ground closed, and was replaced the next day by a bus service.

References

External links
 Colchester Corporation Tramways button
 Colchester Corporation Tramways uniformed staff

See also
List of town tramway systems in the United Kingdom

Tram transport in England
History of Colchester
Rail transport in Essex
1904 establishments in England
1929 disestablishments in England
3 ft 6 in gauge railways in England
Transport in Colchester